The Wienzeile ('Vienna Row') is a street in Vienna, which originated in the course of the regulation of the Vienna River between 1899 and 1905 along the river's banks.

It is divided into the Rechte Wienzeile (Right Vienna Row) and the Linke Wienzeile (Left Vienna Row):

 The Rechte Wienzeile runs through the Viennese districts of Wieden, Margareten, and Meidling and is so named after its position on the right bank of the Vienna River.
 The Linke Wienzeile, located on the left bank of the Vienna River, runs through the Viennese districts of Mariahilf and Rudolfsheim-Fünfhaus.

Before the regulation of the Vienna River, the Rechte Wienzeile was called Wienstraße in the fourth district, Flussgasse in the fifth district, An der Wien, and Wienstraße. The Linke Wienzeile had various names in the sixth district, first Am Wienufer as well as Ufergasse, later Magdalenenstraße and Wienstraße.

The U-Bahn line U4 runs along the entirety of the Wienzeile's length on the stretch of the former Wiener Stadtbahn.
The Wienzeile has a strong architectural presence in the form of Otto Wagner's Jugendstil building in the vicinity of the Naschmarkt.

In the outer districts of Hietzing and Penzing, the extended Wienzeile is called Hietzinger Kai as well as Hadikgasse.

Attractions along the Wienzeile 
 Wienzeilenhäuser by Otto Wagner
 Viennese Naschmarkt
 Theater an der Wien
 Vienna Secession
 Karlsplatz Stadtbahn Station
 Vorwärts building

Streets in Vienna
Buildings and structures in Wieden
Margareten
Meidling
Mariahilf
Rudolfsheim-Fünfhaus